Lionel Grafton Holband (born 25 February 1965) is a Dutch former professional footballer who played as a midfielder for Eredivisie league club FC Groningen between 1990 and 1994.

In 1975, Holband moved with his family from the recently independent Suriname to Groningen in the Netherlands. He became a Dutch citizen in 1983. He briefly joined Hoogeveen and in 1989 FC Groningen. During his tenure, the team had its best ever results in the Eredivisie, finishing 3nd in 1992. Hip problems forced Holband to stop playing in 1994. From 1994 to 2011 he was youth trainer at FC Groningen.

References

1965 births
Living people
Sportspeople from Paramaribo
Footballers from Groningen (city)
Dutch footballers
Association football midfielders
FC Groningen players
Vv Hoogeveen players
Eredivisie players
Surinamese emigrants to the Netherlands